Lisa Küllmer (born  in Frankfurt) is a German female  track cyclist. She competed in the team pursuit event at the 2014 UCI Track Cycling World Championships.

Career results
2015
1st Omnium, Cottbuser Nächte
2016
3rd Omnium, 6 giorni delle rose - Fiorenzuola
2017
GP Zürich - Oerlikon 
1st Scratch Race
3rd Madison (with Michaela Ebert)
2nd Scratch Race, Öschelbronn
2nd Madison, Oberhausen (with Michaela Ebert)
2nd Scratch Race, Dublin International

See also
 2014 UCI Track Cycling World Championships – Women's team pursuit

References

Further reading
 Profile at cyclingarchives.com
 Cycling Fever
 EuroSport
 January 30/13 12:33 pm - Ladies Tour of Qatar Stage 2
 Logaladies Team 

1993 births
Living people
German track cyclists
German female cyclists
Place of birth missing (living people)
Cyclists from Frankfurt
20th-century German women
21st-century German women